Frank Wayne "Tubby" Lockwood (July 14, 1890 – June 7, 1954) was an All-Southern college football guard for Mike Donahue's Auburn Tigers of Auburn University.

Early years
Frank Wayne Lockwood was born on July 14, 1890 in Anniston, Alabama, the son of architect Frank Lockwood. He grew up in Montgomery, Alabama.

College football
He and Big Thigpen made up the core of the line of the undefeated SIAA champion 1913 Auburn Tigers football team. One account of the enthusiasm after the victory over the Mississippi A & M Aggies that year reads '“If the Orange and Blue can show the same punch and the same speed against a heavier team, it is not believed that the Tigers will have to lower her colors to any team this year,” a story said. Injuries became a concern when 220-pound right guard F.W. Lockwood and 194-pound  end G.E. Taylor had knee and ankle problems. Taylor didn't return. “These are the heaviest players on the Auburn squad and their loss deprives the line of any advantage it might have had because of superior weight.”' Lockwood was selected to coach Donahue's all-time Auburn team. One writer claims "Auburn had a lot of great football teams, but there may not have been one greater than the 1913-1914 team."

References

1890 births
1954 deaths
Auburn Tigers football players
American football guards
Players of American football from Montgomery, Alabama
All-Southern college football players